Novaya Uda is a rural locality (a selo) in Ust-Udinsky District of Irkutsk Oblast, Russia.

Joseph Stalin was exiled here on December 9, 1903.

References

Rural localities in Irkutsk Oblast
Irkutsk Governorate